The Stranger from Arizona is a 1938 American Western film directed by Elmer Clifton and written by Monroe Shaff. The film stars Buck Jones, Dorothy Fay, Hank Mann, Hank Worden, Roy Barcroft and Bob Terry. The film was released on September 22, 1938, by Columbia Pictures.

Plot

Cast          
Buck Jones as Buck Weylan
Dorothy Fay as Ann Turner
Hank Mann as Sam Garrison
Hank Worden as Skeeter
Roy Barcroft as Thane
Bob Terry as Talbot
Horace Murphy as Sheriff Trickett
Budd Buster as Abner Trickett
Dot Farley as Martha
Walter Anthony as Sandy
Stanley Blystone as Haskell

References

External links
 

1938 films
1930s English-language films
American black-and-white films
American Western (genre) films
1938 Western (genre) films
Columbia Pictures films
Films directed by Elmer Clifton
1930s American films